Manhattan Heights may refer to:

Manhattan Heights (skyscraper)
Manhattan Heights (El Paso, Texas neighborhood)
Manhattan Beach, California